The Aeros Stalker is the name given to two families of Ukrainian high-wing, single-place, hang gliders, that were designed and produced by Aeros of Kyiv and introduced in 1991 and 1999 respectively. Neither line is in production.

Design and development
The original Stalker series was conceived as a single-place intermediate hang glider for recreational cross country flying. It was the company's first product after splitting from Antonov, with the prototype introduced in 1991. With over 100 flying, the design received British Hang Gliding and Paragliding Association (BHPA) certification in 1994. Production ended when the Stalker was replaced by the Aeros Stealth in production in 1995.

In 1999 Aeros decided to produce a rigid wing hang glider and revived the Stalker name for the new design. In 2001 the glider received German DHV certification. The type was still in production in 2003.

The 2003 model Stalker was noted as being unique among rigid wing hang gliders in that its wing mounts ailerons in place of the more common spoilers. Its  span wing has a nose angle of 146° and an aspect ratio of 11:1.

Specifications (Stalker rigid wing 2003 model)

References

External links

Photos of the Stalker rigid wing

Hang gliders
Stalker